The Mississinawa Moraine begins in Ohio east of  Lima in Hardin County, then running in a shallow arc to the south of Grand Lake St. Marys and St. Marys in Mercer County towards Fort Recovery, Ohio.  Just west of Fort Recovery, the moraine again arches southward towards the Mississinewa River.  The moraine follows the eastern bank of the river northwestward to where it enters the Wabash River at Wabash, Indiana.  Angling towards the north and a little east, the Mississinawa moraine merges with the Packerton Moraine north of the Eel River in Whitley County near Columbia City.  The moraine does not end here, but continues in a northeasterly direction through the three corners area of Michigan, Indiana, and Ohio until reaching Ann Arbor, Michigan where numerous moraines intermingle.
Note:  There are two common spellings of the name.  Mississinawa (an A) is commonly used in the older reports.  Mississinewa (an E) is the modern usage and the spelling used on modern maps and projects associated with the river.  Both spellings are used interchangeably in this article, based on the source material.

Location
The Mississinewa moraine runs northeast from the Wabash River at Lagro through Wabash, Whitley, eastern Noble and western and northern Steuben counties, into Michigan. Continuing to the northeast, the moraine crosses into Hillsdale County and the northwestern corner of Lenawee County, where it merges with the younger Wabash moraine. The southern arm runs to the southeast from the Wabash along the northern shore of the Mississinewa River from which it takes its name. It crosses the northeast and eastern half of Grant County  and its county seat, Marion. In a sweeping arc across northern Mercer County, the Mississinewa moraine merges with the St. Johns moraine in Auglaize and Shelby counties. Running parallel, the Mississinewa is renamed as the Broadway and Powel moraines in Hardin County. The St. Johns moraine is the Ohio continuation of the Salamoine moraine in Indiana.

Description
Its drift is largely clay till and has few boulders. The neighboring plains are of stiff clay till with a few knolls.

Teays River
Soil borings used in the investigation Mississinewa moraine and drift located a preglacial valley in Grant and  Jay Counties in Indiana. Across its length; it is filed with sand and gravel from the Wisconsin glacial period. This valley may relate to the Teays River.

Correlatives
Kalamazoo Morainic System'''
The Kalamazoo morainic system of the Saginaw lobe is a cross link between the Michigan basin and the Huron-Erie basins. Much of its southern area has been altered by a large outwash apron. It is best seen in western Jackson County.

See also
Union City Moraine
Salamonie Moraine
Wabash Moraine
Fort Wayne Moraine
Defiance Moraine
List of glacial moraines

References

 

Moraines of Indiana
Geological history of the Great Lakes
Landforms of Hardin County, Ohio
Landforms of Ohio
Landforms of Michigan
Landforms of Mercer County, Ohio
Landforms of Jackson County, Indiana
Landforms of Wabash County, Indiana
Landforms of Whitley County, Indiana
Landforms of Noble County, Indiana
Landforms of Steuben County, Indiana
Landforms of Hillsdale County, Michigan
Landforms of Lenawee County, Michigan
Landforms of Grant County, Indiana
Landforms of Auglaize County, Ohio
Landforms of Shelby County, Ohio
Landforms of Blackford County, Indiana